Lynton Geoffrey Rowlands (born 19 January 1961 in Ulverstone, Tasmania) was an Australian cricket player, who played List A cricket for Tasmania.

See also
 List of Tasmanian representative cricketers

External links
 Cricinfo Profile

1961 births
Living people
Australian cricketers
Tasmania cricketers
People from Ulverstone, Tasmania
Cricketers from Tasmania